The tenth season of The Walking Dead, an American post-apocalyptic horror television series on AMC, premiered on October 6, 2019, and concluded on April 4, 2021, consisting of 22 episodes. Developed for television by Frank Darabont, the series is based on the eponymous series of comic books by Robert Kirkman, Tony Moore, and Charlie Adlard. The executive producers are Kirkman, David Alpert, Scott M. Gimple, Angela Kang, Greg Nicotero, Joseph Incaprera, Denise Huth, and Gale Anne Hurd, with Kang as showrunner for the second consecutive season. The tenth season received generally positive reviews. It was nominated for multiple awards, including a fifth consecutive nomination for Best Horror Television Series, at the 46th Saturn Awards.

This season adapts material from issues #145–174 of the comic book series and focuses on the group's preparation and war against the Whisperers. Set several months after the massacre perpetrated by Alpha (Samantha Morton) during the community fair, the season focuses on the united communities as they initiate a fight in order to end the threat of the Whisperers.

The tenth season is the final season for series regular Danai Gurira, who has portrayed Michonne since the third season. The planned season finale was scheduled to air on April 12, 2020, but post-production was delayed due to the ongoing COVID-19 pandemic. Instead, the episode aired on October 4, 2020, with an additional six episodes added to the tenth season that were broadcast from February 28 to April 4, 2021.

Cast

Main cast

The tenth season features twenty series regulars overall. Ryan Hurst, Eleanor Matsuura, Cooper Andrews, Nadia Hilker, Cailey Fleming, Cassady McClincy, and Lauren Ridloff were all promoted to series regular status, after previously having recurring roles. Hurst is added to the opening credits, while the rest are credited as "also starring". Beginning with episode 17, Lauren Cohan was re-added to the opening credits and as a series regular.

Starring
 Norman Reedus as Daryl Dixon, a southerner and Rick's former right-hand man. He is a skilled hunter and former recruiter for Alexandria.
 Danai Gurira as Michonne, a katana-wielding warrior and Rick's former romantic partner. She is also adoptive mother to Judith, and mother to her and Rick's child.
 Melissa McBride as Carol Peletier, a survivor who has overcome several traumas, is a skilled and ingenious fighter, and now resides at Alexandria. She is also ex-wife to Ezekiel.
 Christian Serratos as Rosita Espinosa, a pragmatic member of the group who is mother to her and Siddiq's child. She is also in a relationship with Gabriel.
 Josh McDermitt as Eugene Porter, an intelligent survivor who has overcome his fear of walkers. He also fell in love with Rosita.
 Seth Gilliam as Gabriel Stokes, a priest and head of the council of Alexandria who has reconciled his beliefs with what needs to be done to survive. He is also in a relationship with Rosita.
 Ross Marquand as Aaron, a former recruiter from Alexandria who lost his arm in an accident and adoptive father to Gracie.
 Khary Payton as Ezekiel, the charismatic former leader of the Kingdom and ex-husband to Carol.
 Ryan Hurst as Beta, the second-in-command of the Whisperers.
 Samantha Morton as Alpha, the leader of the Whisperers, a mysterious group of survivors who wear the skins of walkers to mask their presence and the main antagonist of the season.
 Jeffrey Dean Morgan as Negan, the reformed former leader of the Saviors who is incarcerated at Alexandria. He formed a parental bond with Michonne's adoptive daughter, Judith.
 Lauren Cohan as Maggie Greene, Glenn's widow and the former leader of the Hilltop, who left with Georgie and is helping with a new distant community. She also has a grudge against Negan for killing her husband.

Also starring
 Callan McAuliffe as Alden, a former member of the Saviors who resides at the Hilltop and now vows a retaliation against the Whisperers. He had been in a relationship with Enid, who was killed by Alpha.
 Avi Nash as Siddiq, a doctor for Alexandria who is the father to his and Rosita's child. He is suffering from PTSD due to being a key witness to Alpha's killings of several members of his group.
 Eleanor Matsuura as Yumiko, Magna's girlfriend who is a proficient archer and former criminal defense lawyer before the apocalypse.
 Cooper Andrews as Jerry, a former resident of the Kingdom and Ezekiel's right-hand man who is in a relationship with Nabila.
 Nadia Hilker as Magna, the feisty former leader of a small group of roaming survivors.
 Cailey Fleming as Judith Grimes, the daughter of Lori Grimes and Shane Walsh, and adopted daughter of Rick and Michonne.
 Cassady McClincy as Lydia, Alpha's daughter and former Whisperer who now resides in Alexandria. She is also Henry's former love interest.
 Havana Blum as young Lydia
 Lauren Ridloff as Connie, a deaf former member of Magna's group who forms a close bond with Daryl.

Supporting cast

Alexandria Safe-Zone
 Lindsley Register as Laura, a former lieutenant of the Saviors who is a member of the council of Alexandria.
 Kenric Green as Scott, a supply runner in Alexandria.
 Mandi Christine Kerr as Barbara, a resident of Alexandria.
 Tamara Austin as Nora, a member of the council of Alexandria and Michonne's friend.
 Anabelle Holloway as Gracie, the adoptive daughter of Aaron.
 Antony Azor as Rick "R.J." Grimes Jr., the son of Rick and Michonne.
 Jerri Tubbs as Margo, a former member of the Highwaymen who resents Lydia.
 David Shae as Alfred, a former member of the Highwaymen and Margo's friend.
 Blaine Kern III as Brandon, a prison guard in Alexandria who watches over Negan.

The Hilltop
 Nadine Marissa as Nabila, a former resident and gardener of the Kingdom, and Jerry's wife.
 Dan Fogler as Luke, a former music teacher who has come to appreciate safety in numbers.
 Angel Theory as Kelly, Connie's alert and protective sister who has a gradual hearing loss.
 John Finn as Earl Sutton, the Hilltop's blacksmith and former husband to Tammy.
 Kerry Cahill as Dianne, one of Ezekiel's top soldiers and a skilled archer.
 Karen Ceesay as Bertie, a teacher at the Hilltop.
 Gustavo Gomez as Marco, a supply runner of the Hilltop.
 Anthony Lopez as Oscar, a resident of the Hilltop.
 Jackson Pace as Gage, a resident of the Hilltop who now resents Lydia over the deaths of his friends.

Oceanside
 Sydney Park as Cyndie, a young woman who is the leader of the Oceanside community.
 Avianna Mynhier as Rachel Ward, a teenage member of Oceanside who represents her community.
 Alex Sgambati as Jules, a member of Oceanside.
 Briana Venskus as Beatrice, one of Oceanside's top soldiers and Cyndie's right-hand.

The Whisperers
 Thora Birch as Gamma / Mary, a member of the Whisperers who is very protective of Alpha.
 Juan Javier Cardenas as Dante, Siddiq's wise-cracking medical assistant and a spy for the Whisperers.
 Juliet Brett as Frances, a member of the Whisperers and Mary's sister who abandoned her newborn-son under Alpha's orders.
 Mark Sivertsen as Rufus, a member of the Whisperers.

Bloodsworth Island
 Kevin Carroll as Virgil, a survivor who seeks Michonne's help to look for his family.
 Eve Gordon as Celeste, a resident of Bloodsworth Island, who was a researcher alongside Virgil and Jeremiah.
 Taylor Nichols as Jeremiah, a resident of Bloodsworth Island, who was a researcher alongside Virgil and Celeste.
 Olivia Stambouliah as Lucy, a resident of Bloodsworth Island, who was a janitor in the island's research facility.

Survivor Caravan
 Breeda Wool as Aiden, a member of a survivor caravan.
 Andrew Bachelor as Bailey, a member of a survivor caravan and Aiden's friend.

The Wardens
 Okea Eme-Akwari as Elijah, a mysterious and masked member of the Wardens.
 James Devoti as Cole, a trusted member of the Wardens.
 Kien Michael Spiller as Hershel Rhee, the son of Glenn and Maggie.

The Commonwealth
 Margot Bingham as Max "Stephanie" Mercer, a survivor from an unknown location who communicates with Eugene over the radio.
 Cameron Roberts as Tyler Davis, a soldier of the Commonwealth military.

Miscellaneous
 Matt Lintz as Henry, the adopted son of Carol and Ezekiel who was killed by Alpha in the ninth season. He appears in Carol's hallucinations.
 Matt Magnum as D.J., a reformed former lieutenant of the Saviors who was killed by Alpha in the ninth season. He appears in Siddiq and Michonne's hallucinations.
 Paola Lázaro as Juanita "Princess" Sanchez, a quirky and flamboyant survivor who has suffered various traumas in her past.
 Lynn Collins as Leah Shaw, the former owner of Dog who formed a loving connection with Daryl.
 Robert Patrick as Mays, a deranged and renegade survivor who lost trust in people.
 Hilarie Burton as Lucille, Negan's late wife who died of pancreatic cancer early in the outbreak. She appears in Negan's flashbacks.
 Miles Mussenden as Franklin, a kind and altruistic doctor who provides medication for Negan's wife. He is also Laura's adoptive father.
 Rodney Rowland as Craven, the antagonistic leader of the motorcycle gang Valak's Vipers.

Episodes

Production
In February 2019, the series was renewed for a tenth season. Filming began in May 2019. Andrew Lincoln expressed interest in directing an episode for season 10, but he was not able to due to scheduling conflicts. Michael Cudlitz, who directed an episode in season 9, returned to direct the fourth and seventh episodes of season 10. Production for the original 16-episode order of season 10 was completed in November 2019. Production resumed in October 2020, for the six additional episodes for season 10. The series moved from shooting on 16 mm film to digital beginning with the six bonus episodes. This changed was prompted due to the COVID-19 pandemic and safety precautions with there being fewer "touch points" with digital than film.

Casting

In February 2019, it was announced that Danai Gurira, who portrays Michonne, would exit the series in the tenth season. Gurira appeared in a limited capacity, in a handful of episodes that was interspersed throughout the season. Later, in July 2019, Gurira confirmed her exit at a panel at the San Diego Comic-Con, and stated:

In July 2019, it was announced that Thora Birch and Kevin Carroll had been cast; Birch plays Gamma, a member of the Whisperers, and Carroll plays Virgil, a survivor looking for his family. Regarding Lauren Cohan's status on the show as Maggie Greene, showrunner Angela Kang remarked in July 2019, "I'll just say that we're working on it." Cohan left The Walking Dead in its ninth season to star in the TV series Whiskey Cavalier, however that series was canceled after one season. In October 2019, Kang affirmed Cohan would return as a series regular in season 11, but also hinted towards her appearance in the second half of season 10. Kang said that in developing season, even before knowing of Cohan's return, they had kept seeding that Maggie was still considered part of the ongoing narrative so that they could work in her return if she had the opportunity. The teaser trailer for "A Certain Doom", airing after the broadcast of "The Tower", confirmed Maggie's return to the series.

As part of the extended episodes for season 10, one focuses on Negan's backstory and introduces his wife Lucille, who is played by Morgan's real-life wife, Hilarie Burton. On November 19, 2020, it was announced that Robert Patrick and Okea Eme-Akwari had been cast for the extended episodes as new characters Mays and Elijah, respectively.

Release
The trailer was released on July 19, 2019, at the San Diego Comic-Con. The season premiere was made available for streaming to subscribers of AMC Premiere on September 29, 2019.

AMC announced in March 2020 that due to the COVID-19 pandemic, post-production on the season finale could not be completed by its planned April 12, 2020, airdate, and instead would air on October 4, 2020. Showrunner Angela Kang stated that the delay on post-production was related with coordination of the worldwide production studios doing their special effects before the state issued its shutdown orders that effectively shuttered their California production studio to combine those into the final episode package. "Home Sweet Home" premiered a week early on February 21, 2021, on AMC+ before its televised air date and subsequent episodes were released every Thursday ahead of its AMC linear premiere on Sunday.

The 22-episode tenth season was released on Blu-ray and DVD on July 20, 2021, with special features including multiple audio commentaries and an "In Memoriam" featurette.

Reception

Critical response
The tenth season of The Walking Dead has received generally positive reviews. On Rotten Tomatoes, the season holds a score of 77% with an average rating of 7 out of 10, based on 6 reviews. The critical consensus reads: "A few changes in front of and behind the camera allow TWD create space for compelling new stories and some seriously scary new adversaries." Commenting on the season premiere, Brandon Davis of Comicbook.com called it a "perfect return" while Alex Zalben of Decider wrote that the episode is "gross, scary, and big budget storytelling the way only Walking Dead can do. Season 10 is already off to a promising start". Paul Tassi of Forbes praised the writing and direction, writing: "The writing remains on point, the direction is solid. The show is still in a good place."

In further reviews based upon the first three episodes available to critics, Tassi wrote that "they're all good episodes, and I think I liked each one more than the last" and "they're very solid and continue my confidence in the Angela Kang era of the show, showing that season 9 wasn't a fluke. The show is genuinely good now, and I can't wait to see what's next". Cameron Bonomolo of Comicbook.com praised the episodes for its horror elements, writing: "The Walking Dead Season 10 recaptures the same tone of raw realism established by first-season showrunner Frank Darabont, expanding on it with a flavoring that is deliciously eerie. Not only is The Walking Dead straight-up scary, it often feels like a genuine horror movie, a feat achieved either through atmosphere and tension-building or pop-up spooks."

Accolades

The tenth season of The Walking Dead received five nominations for the upcoming 46th Saturn Awards—Best Horror Television Series (the series' fifth consecutive nomination, with four consecutive wins), Best Supporting Actor on a Television Series for Norman Reedus (his fourth nomination), Best Supporting Actress on a Television Series for Melissa McBride (her seventh consecutive nomination, with two consecutive wins), Best Performance by a Younger Actor on a Television Series for Cassady McClincy, and Best Guest Starring Performance on a Television Series for Jeffrey Dean Morgan (his fourth consecutive nomination, with two wins).

At the inaugural Critics' Choice Super Awards, the season was also nominated for Best Horror Series and Best Villain in a Series for Samantha Morton. The first half of the season was nominated for Outstanding Action Performance by a Stunt Ensemble a Comedy or Drama Series at the 26th Screen Actors Guild Awards (the series' eighth consecutive nomination). Additionally, Danai Gurira won the Gracie Award for Outstanding Female Actor in a Leading Role in a Drama.

Ratings

References

External links

 
 

10
2019 American television seasons
2020 American television seasons
2021 American television seasons
Television productions suspended due to the COVID-19 pandemic